Koh Kong, Kaoh Kong or Kaôh Kŏng may refer to several places in Cambodia:
 Koh Kong (island), a large island in Koh Kong Province
  Koh Kong Bay, a bay on the coast of Koh kong Province
 Koh Kong District, a district of Koh Kong Province
 Koh Kong Province, a south western province of Cambodia
 Koh Kong (city), the capital of Koh Kong Province
  Koh Kong Mountain, the summit of Koh Kong island
  Koh Kong (village), a village on the island